Southcott is a hamlet east of Bideford in the parish of Westleigh in the district of North Devon, in the county of Devon, England.

The hamlet consists of Southcott Barton to the West and Southcott Cottages to the East. Southcott is bordered by the A39 and the River Torridge.

Southcott House, located in Southcott Barton, is a 17th Century listed farmhouse.

References

External links

Hamlets in Devon
North Devon